Felix Römer (born 1978) is a German historian who specialises in the history of World War II. He has conducted pioneering research into the implementation of the Commissar Order by combat formations of the Wehrmacht and the attitudes of German soldiers based on the surreptitiously recorded conversations of prisoners of war held in Fort Hunt, Virginia, United States.

Education and career 
Römer was born in 1978 in Hamburg, West Germany. He studied history and literature at the University of Kiel and the University of Lyon. His research project focused on the Commissar Order and its implementation by formations of the Wehrmacht down to the divisional level during Operation Barbarossa, the 1941 invasion of the Soviet Union. He earned his PhD from the University of Kiel in 2007.

From 2007 to 2012, Römer worked as a research associate in the project headed by Sönke Neitzel of the History Department at the University of Mainz focused on war perception and collective biography. This project led to the publication of Soldaten: On Fighting, Killing and Dying: The Secret WWII Transcripts of German POWs by Neitzel and Harald Welzer in 2011. For this project Römer compiled   100,000 pages of comprehensive documentary material from the interrogation camp at Fort Hunt, Virginia, where about 3,000 German POWs were both interviewed formally and surreptitiously recorded while held there from 1942 to 1945. Based on this research, Römer published Kameraden – Die Wehrmacht von innen. (Comrades: The Wehrmacht from Within) in 2012. From 2012 to 2019 Römer was a researcher at the German Historical Institute London. Since 2019 he is working at the Humboldt University in Berlin.

Research on the Commissar Order
Römer's book on the Commissar Order, published in 2008 in German as Der Kommissarbefehl. Wehrmacht und NS-Verbrechen an der Ostfront 1941/42 (The Commissar Order: The Wehrmacht and the Nazi Crimes on the Eastern Front, 1941–1942), was the first complete account of the implementation of the order by the combat formations of the Wehrmacht. Römer's research shows that 116 out of 137 German divisions on the Eastern Front filed reports detailing the killing of the Red Army's political commissars. As a result of the order, by May 1942, a total of at least 3,430 and possibly as many as 4,000 Commissars were murdered by regular Wehrmacht soldiers after surrendering.

Römer finds that the records "prove that Hitler's generals had executed his murderous orders without scruples or hesitations", contrary to the myth of a "clean" Wehrmacht. Historian Wolfram Wette, reviewing the book, notes that the sporadic objections to the order were merely pragmatic and that its cancellation in 1942 was "not a return to morality, but an opportunistic course correction". Wette concludes:

The Commissar Order, which has always had a particularly strong influence on the image of the Wehrmacht because of its obviously criminal character, has finally been clarified. Once again the observation has confirmed itself: the deeper the research penetrates into the military history, the gloomier the picture becomes.

Kameraden
Römer's 2012 book Kameraden was based on the surreptitiously recorded conversations of German prisoners of war held in Fort Hunt, United States. Like Soldaten by Neitzel and Welzer, Römer's book finds that soldiers were not simply "ideological warriors" in the National Socialist mold. "But this does not mean that the soldiers had no opinions", Römer states. The majority continued to support Hitler and the German war effort until the last year of the war. The book also finds that racism and anti-Semitism were widespread. The younger soldiers, those of the Hitler Youth generation who grew up during the Nazi regime, believed in a victory for longer than older soldiers who had grown up in the German Empire or the Weimar Republic. National Socialist socialization thus becomes apparent, according to Römer's research. A small group of POWs, who Römer identified as having a "fanatical worldview", even boasted of war crimes.

The murder of the Jews was an "open secret" among the soldiers. While there were some supporters of the killing of Jews, the majority rejected this approach. For most of the soldiers there were apparently limits. The book finds these included violence against women and children or against defenseless Soviet POWs. But in the reality of the war, Römer concludes, the group dynamics were often stronger than moral scruples.

Selected works

In English
 
 Römer, Felix (2019). Comrades. The Wehrmacht from within. Oxford University Press, .

In German
Der Kommissarbefehl. Wehrmacht und NS-Verbrechen an der Ostfront 1941/42. Schöningh, Paderborn 2008, 
Kameraden. Die Wehrmacht von innen. Munich: Piper Verlag. 2012. .
 Alfred Andersch desertiert. Fahnenflucht und Literatur (1944–1952). Verbrecher Verlag, Berlin 2015. With  and Rolf Seubert

Notes

References

Further reading

External links
  (In German)

Living people
1978 births
German military historians
Historians of World War II
German male non-fiction writers
20th-century German historians
Writers from Hamburg